A total lunar eclipse took place on 15 June 2011. It was the first of two such eclipses in 2011. The second occurred on 10 December 2011. While the visual effect of a total eclipse is variable, the Moon may have been stained a deep orange or red colour at maximum eclipse.

This was a relatively rare central lunar eclipse, in which the center point of Earth's shadow passes across the moon. The last time a lunar eclipse was closer to the center of the earth's shadow was on 16 July 2000. The next central total lunar eclipse was on 27 July 2018 over South America, western Africa, and Europe, and setting over eastern Asia.

Visibility and viewing

In western Asia, Australia, and the Philippines, the lunar eclipse was visible just before sunrise. It was very visible in the clear and cloudless night sky throughout eastern and southeast Asia. Africa, far eastern Russia and Europe witnessed the whole event even in the late stages (as in partial lunar eclipse). The Americas (including North and northwestern South America) missed the eclipse completely (except in most areas) because it occurred at moonset.

Photo gallery

Related eclipses

Eclipses of 2011 
 A partial solar eclipse on 4 January.
 A partial solar eclipse on 1 June.
 A total lunar eclipse on 15 June.
 A partial solar eclipse on 1 July.
 A partial solar eclipse on 25 November.
 A total lunar eclipse on 10 December.

It was preceded by the partial solar eclipse of January 4, 2011, and the partial solar eclipse of 1 June 2011.

Semester series 

This eclipse is the center of nine lunar eclipses in a short-lived series. Each eclipse in the series repeats after one semester (6 lunations or 177 days) occurring at alternating nodes.

Saros series

Tritos series

Inex series

Tzolkinex 
 Preceded: Lunar eclipse of May 4, 2004

 Followed: Lunar eclipse of July 27, 2018

Half-Saros cycle
A lunar eclipse will be preceded and followed by solar eclipses by 9 years and 5.5 days (a half saros). This lunar eclipse is related to two annular solar eclipses of Solar Saros 137.

See also 
List of lunar eclipses and List of 21st-century lunar eclipses
December 2010 lunar eclipse
December 2011 lunar eclipse
 :File:2011-06-15 Lunar Eclipse Sketch.gif Chart
Solar eclipse

Notes

References 
 Bao-Lin Liu, Canon of Lunar Eclipses 1500 B.C.-A.D. 3000, 1992

External links 

Live-webcast of the lunar eclipse on 15 June 2011, University of Applied Sciences Offenburg/Germany
 Live Free Lunar eclipse webcast & hands-on lunar eclipse experiments: 2011-06-15 
Live eclipse webcasts, Ciclope group/Technical University of Madrid
Live eclipse webcasts, Sky Watchers Association of North Bengal
 Hermit eclipse: 2011-06-15
 NASA: Lunar Eclipses: Past and Future
 
 Index to Five Millennium Catalog of Lunar Eclipses, −1999 to +3000 (2000 BCE to 3000 CE)
 Eclipses: 2001 to 2100
 Live webcast by Tübitak  – the Turkish National Observatory
 Live webcast from the SLOOH Space Camera and Google Earth. The eclipse stages are also being incorporated into a Google doodle operating during the eclipse.

Webcast
 The Central Lunar Eclipse was shown live through WEBCAST – By Sky Watchers Association of North Bengal(SWAN) Siliguri, West Bengal  or  
 By Eclipse Chaser Athaenium New Delhi 
 By Astronation.net  
 By Ciclope group and Shelios 

2011-06
2011-06
2011 in science
June 2011 events